Beth Israel Congregation is an egalitarian Conservative synagogue located at 600 Camden Avenue in Salisbury, Maryland.

Founded in 1925, it was organized by I.L. Benjamin upon the death of his father, and originally called Kahelas Israel Congregation. At the time there were only nine Jewish families in Salisbury.

Beth Israel moved to its current building in 1951. In 2006 it was recognized by both the Wicomico County and Salisbury councils for 80 years of providing services and programs to "residents of the Lower Eastern Shore of Maryland, Delaware and Virginia".

Notes

External links
Synagogue website

Conservative synagogues in Maryland
Religious buildings and structures in Wicomico County, Maryland
Synagogues completed in 1951
Jewish organizations established in 1925
Buildings and structures in Salisbury, Maryland
1925 establishments in Maryland